Paweł Abratkiewicz (born 10 June 1970) is a Polish speed skater. He was born in Opoczno. He competed at the 1992 Winter Olympics, 1998 Winter Olympics, and 2002 Winter Olympics, in 500 metres and 1,000 metres.

References

External links
 
 
 

1970 births
Living people
Polish male speed skaters
Olympic speed skaters of Poland
Speed skaters at the 1992 Winter Olympics
Speed skaters at the 1998 Winter Olympics
Speed skaters at the 2002 Winter Olympics
People from Opoczno
Sportspeople from Łódź Voivodeship